Ervia, previously known as Bord Gáis or Bord Gáis Éireann (meaning "Gas Board of Ireland"), is a multi-utility company distributing pipeline natural gas, water services and dark fibre services in Ireland. The state-owned company has built an extensive network across Ireland.

In 2014 the Bord Gáis Energy division was sold to a consortium led by Centrica, and the Bord Gáis name was transferred as part of the sale. Bord Gáis Éireann was therefore renamed Ervia in June 2014 and as a result no longer sells gas directly to 
customers. Ervia is the parent company of Ireland's largest utility company, Irish Water along with dark fibre operator Aurora Telecom.

History
Bord Gáis Éireann was established as a semi-state company by the Irish government in 1975 to replace a series of private-sector small city-based gas companies, some of whom had got into financial trouble. The company was originally established as a private limited company by shares, Bord Gáis Éireann Teoranta, before being converted to a statutory corporation under the Gas Act 1976, the primary legislation under which BGE operates.

The oldest of the small private companies was the Alliance and Dublin Consumers' Gas Company, which had been founded in the early nineteenth century by Daniel O'Connell, a prominent Irish politician and Lord Mayor of Dublin. After initially supplying the company (known simply as Dublin Gas by the 1980s) with wholesale natural gas, Bord Gáis acquired the assets of the company when it went into receivership in 1987, including its head office in D'Olier Street, Dublin. Other town gas companies were acquired by Bord Gáis in Cork, Limerick, Clonmel, and Kilkenny.

In 2002 the then Bord Gáis Éireann sold the landmark art deco Dublin Gas head office building in D'Olier Street, Dublin to Trinity College Dublin. this building was designed by Robinson and Keefe Architects in about 1928. The exterior is clad in grey and black stone. The interior which was originally lit by Gasoliers still remains as a protected structure.  Bord Gáis moved to purpose built premises in Foley Street, Dublin, which is now the main offices of Bord Gáis Energy. Bord Gáis now have offices at Lower Mount Street, Dublin.

For nearly two decades the main supply of gas available for Bord Gáis came from a Marathon Petroleum owned gasfield near Kinsale, off the Cork coast. This gas field had been found in 1971, the same year as the foundation of the Nuclear Energy Board.  This gas field comes ashore at Inch, Co. Cork.

Deregulation of the Irish gas market
Beginning in the early 2000s Ireland's state owned public utilities underwent major reform thanks to the adoption by EU members of the European Union's Third Energy Package. This required vertically integrated utilities such as Bord Gáis Éireann to legally demarcate and split into two roles: the Transmission System Operator (TSO) and the Distribution System Operator (DSO) although a combined DSO/TSO was permissible as long as the two were ring-fenced from one another 
  This resulted in two new "arms length" entities being created inside the Bord Gáis group; Bord Gáis Networks and Bord Gáis Energy Supply. A similar situation took place with the Electricity Supply Board with it being split into two main units, legally distinct and separate; ESB Networks and ESB Customer Supply, now called Electric Ireland, although both being owned by the ESB Group.

On 18 February 2009 Bord Gáis Energy Supply rebranded as Bord Gáis Energy and competed in a new, fully deregulated gas market, legally separate and distinct from the rest of Bord Gáis Éireann. As part of the overall opening up of the energy market in Ireland as a whole Bord Gáis Energy entered the deregulated electricity market offering dual fuel bundles to consumers. Other companies including Airtricity and Electric Ireland also began competing with Bord Gáis Energy in the gas sector, with Bord Gáis Networks being impartial towards all companies who wished to utilise the gas network. It was expected BGE would be no different than any other gas provider.

Sale of Bord Gáis Energy
A condition of the EU/IMF bailout programme for Ireland required the Irish government to sell off some state owned assets to help pay down loans and reduce Ireland's debt burden. In February 2012 it was announced by the Irish government announced it would sell Bord Gáis Energy as required under the bailout terms.

In March 2014 Bord Gáis Éireann confirmed it would sell its customer supply arm Bord Gáis Energy to a consortium made up of Centrica, Brookfield Renewable Energy and iCON Infrastructure to the value of €1.1 billion. The sale involved the splitting of the group's retail unit among the three buyers. The main retail division would be bought by Centrica, while its wind assets under SWS would be acquired by Brookfield Renewable Energy Partners and iCON infrastructure acquiring Northern Ireland based Firmus Energy. As part of the deal the Bord Gáis name would go to Centrica requiring the rump entity to be renamed.

In June 2014 Bord Gáis Éireann was renamed Ervia becoming a holding company of three distinct but complementary utility firms: Gas Networks Ireland (formerly Bord Gáis Networks), Irish Water and Aurora Telecoms.

Subsidiaries

Gas Networks Ireland

Gas Networks Ireland is responsible for the development, operation and maintenance of Ireland's natural gas network. The network provides gas to customers in all major Irish cities, along with several towns across the country. Numerous suppliers provide gas services to customers and businesses via this network of pipelines. Two interconnectors link the pipeline network to Scotland (with a spur linking to the Isle of Man supplying the Manx Electricity Authority).

Most of its modern gas supply is imported, though a new gas field known as the Corrib off the Mayo coast is scheduled to come onstream by 2016, however Ervia will only be purchasing a small amount of the offtake; the majority will be traded on the Intercontinental Exchange.

Irish Water

The Water Services Act (2013) formally created Irish Water as a subsidiary of Bord Gáis Éireann, to provide "safe, clean and affordable water and waste water services" to water users in Ireland. Public concerns on operational, documentation, and financial issues were highlighted throughout the initial months of the subsidiary's operations.

Irish Water is accountable to two regulatory bodies, the Commission for Regulation of Utilities (CRU) who is the economic regulator for the water industry, and the Environmental Protection Agency (EPA) who is the environmental regulator.

Aurora Telecom
Aurora Telecom specialises in providing dark fibre services to the private sector. Due to being a sister company of Gas Networks Ireland Aurora Telecom is able to utilise the former's extensive gas pipeline network to lay fibre optic lines, principally in Dublin, though with a network now stretching from the capital to Cork, Limerick and Galway via several towns including Athlone, Mullingar and Ennis.

Former Operations

Bord Gáis Energy

Bord Gáis Energy was previously the retail (industrial, commercial and residential) division of Bord Gáis Éireann. In February 2012 the Irish government announced its intention to sell Bord Gáis Energy as part of the reforms required following the banking crisis bailout and finalised the deal in June 2014. Today Bord Gáis Energy is a completely independent entity from Ervia.

Bord Gáis retail network
Bord Gáis Éireann maintained twelve stores (branded Energy Supply Stores) around the country, however they are run on a franchise basis and not by Bord Gáis itself. In 2002 Bord Gáis Natural Gas Showroom in D'Olier Street, operated by the company itself, was closed, in 2006 its Cork company-owned showroom was also closed.

SWS
In late 2009 Bord Gáis Éireann bought the wind energy company SWS.

However, as part of the large scale EU/IMF mandated divestiture of many state assets mid 2014 the company was sold to Canadian energy firm Brookfield Renewable Energy Partners for US$680 million as part of the sale of Bord Gáis Energy to British energy giant Centrica.

Firmus Energy

Bord Gáis had a plan to develop the gas market in Northern Ireland. A pipeline from Carrickfergus to Derry was completed in October 2004 and now serves Coolkeeragh Power Station. A second pipeline, known as the south–north pipeline, was commissioned in October 2006. It runs from Gormanston in the Republic of Ireland to join the Carrick/Derry pipeline near Antrim creating an all-Ireland network and providing redundancy in case of problems with either Scotland - Northern Ireland pipeline or the Scotland - Ireland interconnectors.

The Utility Regulator for Northern Ireland awarded Bord Gáis a licence to supply homes and businesses in the towns and cities near the two pipelines - Antrim, Armagh, Ballymena, Ballymoney, Banbridge, Craigavon, Derry, Limavady and Newry - where the local subsidiaries of BG used the trading name of Firmus Energy. On 1 December 2005, Firmus launched their first supply in Northern Ireland, to the large Michelin tyre factory in Ballymena. On 25 April 2006 Firmus connected its first residential customers in Derry.

As part of the Irish government's disposal of state owned assets Firmus Energy was sold in March 2014 to iCON Infrastructure.

Gaslink
On 4 July 2008, an "arms-length" subsidiary of Bord Gáis, Gaslink was established to perform the role of transmission and distribution system operator. However, as part of cost-cutting measures on 1 August 2015 Gaslink was abolished and its responsibilities rolled back into Gas Networks Ireland.

Main offices
 Ervia HQ - Webworks, Eglinton Street, Cork 
 Gas Networks Ireland - Gasworks Road, Cork 
 Irish Water - Colvill House, 24-26 Talbot Street, Dublin 1  , 
 Aurora Telecom - Donmoy House, St Margaret's Road, Finglas, Dublin 11

External links
 Ervia
 Gas Networks Ireland
 Irish Water
 Aurora Telecom

References

Natural gas companies of the Republic of Ireland
State-sponsored bodies of the Republic of Ireland
Utilities of the United Kingdom
Oil and gas companies of the United Kingdom
Department of the Environment, Climate and Communications